Percy (also known as Percy vs Goliath) is a 2020 Canadian-American-Indian biographical drama film, directed by Clark Johnson from a screenplay by Garfield Lindsay Miller and Hilary Pryor. It stars Christopher Walken, Christina Ricci, Zach Braff, Luke Kirby, Adam Beach, Martin Donovan, Roberta Maxwell and Peter Stebbings. The film follows 70-year-old small-town Saskatchewan farmer Percy Schmeiser, who takes on a giant corporation after their GMOs interfere with his crops.

The film premiered at the 2020 Quebec City Film Festival and it was theatrically released in Canada by Mongrel Media on October 9, 2020.

Plot
Based on the events of Schmeiser Vs. Monsanto, Percy Schmeiser was a Saskatchewan canola farmer that received a legal action from Monsanto. It has been determined that Percy's fields contained Monsanto's Roundup resistant crops and accused him of intellectual property theft. He unknowingly planted seeds that belonged to Monsanto during 1997; Monsanto wants all of his seeds and the profits he made with his work the following year. Percy was a seed saver and didn't use Monsanto's seeds, but his neighbors did and he believed this was a case of contamination. Seeking legal help from local lawyer Jackson Weaver, it was evident it was a losing battle as the laws favor Monsanto.

Percy's life begins to suffer under the weight of the court-case. He and his family have become the community's pariah and his debts continue to mount. Rebecca Salcau, a representative of the People's Environmental Protect (PEP) offered to help, but it would mean Percy would have to publicly speak against Monsanto to gain media attention and earn revenue to fund his fight. Initially resistant in making it into a public spectacle, Percy became enraged when he discovered that Monsanto's men had been following him and destroying his reputation by labelling him as a thief. Fired up, Percy began engaging in public speaking events against Monsanto.

Percy's public speaking and media exposure began to take on a life of its own. People throughout the world began offering donations and letters of support. As the fight against Monsanto continued, Percy realized his situation wasn't unique and was a global concern. While speaking in India, Percy learned the devastating effects that the agribusiness had caused, especially farmers who were committing suicide over severe debt and ruined lives. When he returned home, his wife has been hospitalized with a broken arm and it seemed they're slated to lose again.

Jackson doesn't believe they'll win, but felt obligated to advise Percy that he could still appeal to the supreme court. Rebecca's own people can't financially support Percy anymore and withdrew their support. Percy was ready to admit defeat, but with the encouragement of his wife, he decided to appeal to the supreme court. When Jackson learned about Percy's decision to fight, he offered his letter of resignation; but Percy ripped it up and they went straight to work. Ultimately, the supreme court determined that Percy could keep his farm, but would have to give up all of the Roundup Ready seeds to Monsanto. With his home saved, the town now sees Percy in a better light and he returned Monsanto's property to them. Rebecca came to tell Percy that his fight with Monsanto had convinced Canadian farmers not to grow Monsanto's GMO wheat, and then US farmers followed suit, halting Monsanto's hold on wheat production. Percy resumes his work on the farm, preparing for the next season while his granddaughter was excited to take it over one day.

Cast
 Christopher Walken as Percy Schmeiser
 Christina Ricci as Rebecca Salcau
 Zach Braff as Jackson Weaver
 Luke Kirby as Peter Schmeiser
 Adam Beach as Alton Kelly
 Martin Donovan as Rick Aarons
 Roberta Maxwell as Louise Schmeiser

Production
In September 2018, Christopher Walken, Christina Ricci, Luke Kirby, Adam Beach, Martin Donovan, Roberta Maxwell, Peter Stebbings and Zach Braff joined the cast of the film, with Clark Johnson directing from a screenplay by Garfield Lindsay Miller and Hilary Pryor. Principal photography began in Winnipeg that same month.

Reception
On the review aggregator website Rotten Tomatoes, the film has a 76% approval rating, based on 49 reviews, with an average rating of 6.2/10. The website's consensus reads, "Percy vs Goliath teeters toward heavy-handed messaging, but Christopher Walken's work in the central role helps keep this fact-based story upright."

References

External links
 
 
 

2020 biographical drama films
English-language Canadian films
English-language Indian films
American biographical drama films
Canadian biographical drama films
Indian biographical drama films
Films about farmers
Films directed by Clark Johnson
Films set in 1998
Films set in 1999
Films set in 2000
Films set in 2001
Films set in Ottawa
Films set in Saskatchewan
Films set in Washington, D.C.
Films shot in Winnipeg
2020s English-language films
Canadian films based on actual events
2020s Canadian films
2020s American films